The Orzeł class was a short series of submarines built in Dutch shipyards for the Polish Navy in the 1930s. Four submarines were planned but only two were completed. They saw service during World War II.

Design
Design was made in cooperation with a team from Polish Navy, and incorporated some features of the earlier Dutch submarine  including the external trainable mount. The hull was entirely welded, and all controls were hydraulically operated. The design was made to fulfill the Polish requirements for a multi-purpose vessel, to be used both in the shallow waters of the Baltic Sea and in the high seas. They were among the most modern submersibles in the Allied fleets at the outbreak of World War II. This class of submarine was the basis for next Dutch s.

Two further submarines based upon the plans of the Orzeł class were ordered from France in 1938 and their construction began in 1939, but because of the outbreak of war, they were never completed.

Service history

Orzeł was ordered in 1935 and commissioned in February 1939. After the outbreak of World War II, on 14 September 1939 Orzeł and Wilk (Wolf) were ordered to make for British ports. Wilk arrived in Britain on 20 September 1939. Orzeł arrived on 14 October 1939, after escaping from internment in neutral Estonia (the Orzeł incident) and an adventurous voyage with no charts. On 8 April 1940 Orzeł sank the troopship  at the start of the German invasion of Norway. Orzeł was lost with all hands due to unknown reasons while on patrol in North Sea. Orzełs loss is one of the biggest mysteries in Polish naval history.

Boats in class
There were two boats of the Orzeł class built. Two more were ordered from France, but never completed.

References
Citations

References
 R Gardiner, R Chesnau (1980) Conway's All the World's Fighting Ships, Conway Maritime Press 
 Jackson, Robert. Submarines of the World. Barnes and Noble Books, New York.

External links
 Orzeł class at uboat.net

Orzeł-class submarines
World War II submarines of Poland
World War II submarines of the Netherlands